The term AA-5 or AA5 may refer to:

 AA-5 Ash, NATO reporting name for the Bisnovat R-4 a Soviet long-range air-to-air missile
 Grumman American AA-5, an American light aircraft
 All American Five, a basic design for a mass-produced superheterodyne radio using five tubes
 Gardiner's designated symbol for the hieroglyph for a part of steering gear of a ship